Classical Mechanics is a well-established textbook written by Thomas Walter Bannerman Kibble and Frank Berkshire of the Imperial College Mathematics Department.  The book provides a thorough coverage of the fundamental principles and techniques of classical mechanics, a long-standing subject which is at the base of all of physics.

Publication history 

The English language editions were published as follows:
The first edition was published by Kibble, as Kibble, T. W. B. Classical Mechanics. London: McGraw–Hill, 1966. 296 p. 
The second ed., also just by Kibble, was in 1973 . 
The 4th, jointly with F H Berkshire, was is 1996
The 5th, jointly with  F H Berkshire, in 2004

The book has been translated into several languages: 
French,  by Michel Le Ray and  Françoise Guérin as  Mécanique classique
Modern Greek, by Δ. Σαρδελής και Π. Δίτσας, επιμέλεια Γ. Ι. Παπαδόπουλος. Σαρδελής, Δ. Δίτσας, Π as Κλασσική μηχανική
German
Turkish, by Kemal Çolakoğlu as Klasik mekanik
Spanish, as  Mecánica clásica
Portuguese as  Mecanica classica

Reception 

The various editions are  held in 1789 libraries.
In comparison, the various (2011) editions of Herbert Goldstein's Classical Mechanics are held in 1772. libraries

The original edition was reviewed in Current Science.
The fourth edition was reviewed by C. Isenberg in 1997 in the European Journal of Physics, and the fifth edition was reviewed in Contemporary Physics.

Contents (5th edition) 

 Preface
 Useful Constants and Units
 Chapter 1: Introduction
 Chapter 2: Linear motion
 Chapter 3: Energy and Angular momentum
 Chapter 4: Central Conservative Forces
 Chapter 5: Rotating Frames
 Chapter 6: Potential Theory
 Chapter 7: The Two-Body Problem
 Chapter 8: Many-Body Systems
 Chapter 9: Rigid Bodies
 Chapter 10: Lagrangian mechanics
 Chapter 11: Small oscillations and Normal modes
 Chapter 12: Hamiltonian mechanics
 Chapter 13: Dynamical systems and their geometry
 Chapter 14: Order and Chaos in Hamiltonian systems
 Appendix A: Vectors
 Appendix B: Conics
 Appendix C: Phase plane Analysis near Critical Points
 Appendix D: Discrete Dynamical Systems – Maps
 Answers to Problems
 Bibliography
 Index

See also 
 Newtonian mechanics
 Classical Mechanics (Goldstein book)
List of textbooks on classical and quantum mechanics

References

External links 
  

2004 non-fiction books
Classical mechanics
Mathematical physics
Physics textbooks
Theoretical physics